The principle of least constraint is one variational formulation of classical mechanics enunciated by Carl Friedrich Gauss in 1829, equivalent to all other formulations of analytical mechanics. Intuitively, it says that the acceleration of a constrained physical system will be as similar as possible to that of the corresponding unconstrained system.

Statement

The principle of least constraint is a least squares principle stating that the true accelerations of a mechanical system of  masses is the minimum of the quantity

where the jth particle has mass , position vector , and applied non-constraint force  acting on the mass.

The notation  indicates time derivative of a vector function , i.e. position. The corresponding accelerations  satisfy the imposed constraints, which in general depends on the current state of the system, .

It is recalled the fact that due to active  and reactive (constraint)  forces being applied, with resultant , a system will experience an acceleration .

Connections to other formulations

Gauss's principle is equivalent to D'Alembert's principle.

The principle of least constraint is qualitatively similar to Hamilton's principle, which states that the true path taken by a mechanical system is an extremum of the action.  However, Gauss's principle is a true (local) minimal principle, whereas the other is an extremal principle.

Hertz's principle of least curvature

Hertz's principle of least curvature is a special case of Gauss's principle, restricted by the two conditions that there are no externally applied forces, no interactions (which can usually be expressed as a potential energy), and all masses are equal. Without loss of generality, the masses may be set equal to one. Under these conditions, Gauss's minimized quantity can be written

The kinetic energy  is also conserved under these conditions

Since the line element  in the -dimensional space of the coordinates is defined

the conservation of energy may also be written

Dividing  by  yields another minimal quantity

Hertz's principle is also a special case of Jacobi's formulation of the least-action principle.

See also

 Appell's equation of motion

References

External links
 A modern discussion and proof of Gauss's principle
Gauss principle in the Encyclopedia of Mathematics
Hertz principle in the Encyclopedia of Mathematics

Classical mechanics